Richard Stevenson (or Stephenson) may refer to:

Politicians
Richard Stevenson (MP), English politician, MP for Boston in 1586–1801
Richard Stevenson (Australian politician) (1832–1899), Australian politician in New South Wales
Dick Stevenson (Richard R. Stevenson), member of the Pennsylvania House of Representatives

Others
Larry Stevenson (Richard Lawrence Stevenson, 1930–2012), American inventor of the skateboard kicktail
Richard Lipez (born 1938), American mystery author who publishes under the pen name Richard Stevenson
F. Richard Stephenson (born 1941), British astronomer
Richard Stevenson (poet) (born 1952), Canadian poet
Richie Stephens (born 1966), Jamaican singer born Richard Stephenson
Richard J Stephenson (active since 1988), American businessman
Richard Stephenson (footballer) (born 1949), Zambian footballer
Rick Stephenson (Richard W. Stephenson), American bodybuilder
Rick Stevenson, writer, director, and producer